Thomas Lewis Hemingway (born 19 May 1986) is an English former first-class cricketer.

Hemingway was born in May 1986 at Stevenage. He was educated at Winchester College, before going up to Trinity Hall, Cambridge. While studying at Cambridge, he made two first-class appearances for Cambridge University against Oxford University in The University Matches of 2007 and 2008, in addition to making three first-class appearances for Cambridge UCCE against Essex, Somerset and Warwickshire in 2008. For Cambridge University he took 8 wickets with best figures of 4 for 58 with his off break bowling, while for Cambridge UCCE he took 6 wickets with best figures of 2 for 32. His overall first-class bowling average was 48.07.

Notes and references

External links

1986 births
Living people
People from Stevenage
People educated at Winchester College
Alumni of Trinity Hall, Cambridge
English cricketers
Cambridge University cricketers
Cambridge MCCU cricketers